Lily Yu Monteverde, nicknamed Mother Lily (born August 19, 1938), is a Filipina film producer and businesswoman.

She is the first and many Filipina Movie producers who produced the boom of blockbuster films in different genres in the 70s and 80’s she made lead stars out of Alma Moreno and Lorna Tolentino and Maricel Soriano Snooky Serna and Dina Bonnievie with the junior movie stars out of Manilyn Reynes and Sheryl Cruz and Aiko Melendez and Carmina Villaroel as Regal babies. Transitioning to making bigger names out of TV stars Richard Gomez and Aga Muhlach as A list actors in the early 90s

Biography
Lily Monteverde has produced nearly 300 films in the Philippines since the early 1960s. She operated Regal Entertainment, in the Philippines for many years. The Mano Po anthology, began in 2002 and produced by her filmmaking firm, pays tribute to her Chinese Filipino roots and became a hit in various local audiences.

In August 1996 she invested much of her substantial wealth into hotels in Quezon City. She opened the Imperial Palace Suites on the site of an old gasoline station at the corner of Tomas Morato and Timog avenues in Quezon.

In 2000, she received the Lifetime Achievement Award from Cinemanila International Film Festival. She also received the Fernando Poe Jr. Lifetime Achievement Award in the 37th Luna Awards in 2019.

Personal life
Monteverde is the mother of UAAP basketball champion coach Goldwin Monteverde of UP Fighting Maroons.

Awards

References

External links
 

1938 births
Living people
Filipino film studio executives
Filipino film producers
20th-century Filipino businesspeople
Hoteliers
Filipino people of Chinese descent